New Conditions is an album by composer Graham Collier which was originally released on his own Mosaic label in 1976.

Reception

Allmusic said "This is a frustrating composition in many ways because of all its gaps, and they are the most trouble of all. Collier has composed a mirror image of traditional jazz charts: this is all freely improvised, with certain scored "interruptions" for the ensemble. The effect is stultifying. The "free flow" at the heart of the conceptualization of this work feels hackneyed, as clearly not all of the musicians here are "free" improvisers. Sorry, as brilliant as Collier is, this one falls short of the mark for him". On All About Jazz Nic Jones noted "New Conditions is a particularly apposite title ... Collier is still playing bass but it's clear that his music's evolution is in a sense altering his own status within it. Even in the introduction, it's apparent that elements of the free are assuming a higher profile, but it's clear too that the way in which Collier is marshalling the larger ensemble heralds the music still to come, and not merely in terms of the overall conception of the album".

Track listing
All compositions by Graham Collier.
 "Introduction" – 4:05
 "Part One & Two" – 8:30
 "Part Three" – 3:45
 "Part Four" 	5:20
 "Part Five & Six" – 7:30
 "Part Seven" – 3:55
 "Part Eight" – 5:00
 "Finale" – 3:45

Personnel
Graham Collier – composer, director, bass
Harry Beckett – trumpet
 Pete Duncan  – trumpet
Henry Lowther – trumpet
Art Themen – soprano saxophone
 Alan Wakeman – soprano saxophone
Mike Page – alto saxophone
Malcolm Griffiths – trombone
Ed Speight – guitar
Roger Dean – piano
John Webb – drums
John Mitchell – percussion

References

1976 albums
Graham Collier albums